Cladogelonium is a monotypic plant genus of the family Euphorbiaceae first described as a genus in 1939.

The only known species is the shrub Cladogelonium madagascariense. It is found in the Analamerana Special Reserve in northern Madagascar.

References

Monotypic Euphorbiaceae genera
Crotonoideae
Endemic flora of Madagascar
Taxa named by Jacques Désiré Leandri